Many languages have a southern dialect, sometimes more than one. This page does not list all possible southern dialects; you may have better luck looking up the language in question. See also :Category:Languages

 Amami
 There are at least two southern dialects of English:
 Southern American English
 Southern English of England
 Welsh
 Southern dialect of the New Mixed Dialects of Polish